During the 2007–08 season, Beşiktaş competed in the Süper Lig.

Season summary
Beşiktaş had the unsavoury distinction of setting the record for the heaviest defeat in Champions League history. Away to English giants Liverpool, who Beşiktaş had beat at home just weeks earlier, half-time arrived with the score at 2-0. However, Liverpool scored 6 more times in the second half to win 8-0, a scoreline that has yet to be bettered over one leg in the Champions League since.

Players

First-team squad
Squad at end of season

Left club during season

Turkish Super Cup

Süper Lig

First Half

Second half

Standings

Turkish Cup

After finishing in the top four of the previous season's Süper Lig, Beşiktaş qualified for the group stages. Beşiktaş was placed in Group A, along with Ankaraspor, MKE Ankaragücü, Çaykur Rizespor and Diyarbakır Diskispor. Beşiktaş finished second.

Group stage

Quarter-finals

3-3 on aggregate. Çaykur Rizespor won on away goals.

Champions League

Second qualifying round

Beşiktaş won 4–0 on aggregate.

Third qualifying round

Beşiktaş won 3–1 on aggregate.

Group stage

References

Notes

Beşiktaş J.K.
Beşiktaş J.K. seasons